Holvik or Holvika (sometimes spelled Holevik) is a small village on the south side of the island of Vågsøy in Kinn Municipality in Vestland county, Norway. It is situated along the Vågsfjorden, a part of the large Nordfjorden.

During World War II, Operation Archery took place in and around Holvik and Måløy.

References

Villages in Vestland
Kinn